Hafsa Hatun was a Turkish princess, and the wife of Bayezid I, 14th century, of the Ottoman Empire.

Life
Hafsa Hatun was the daughter of Isa Bey, the ruler of the Aydinids. She was married to Bayezid in 1390 upon his conquest of the Aydinids. Her father had surrendered without a fight, and a marriage was arranged between her and Bayezid. Thereafter, Isa was sent to exile in Iznik, shorn of his power, where he subsequently died. Her marriage strengthened the bonds between the two families.

Charities
Hafsa Hatun's public works are located within her father's territory and may have been built before she married Bayezid. She commissioned a fountain in Tire city and a Hermitage in Bademiye, and a mosque known as "Hafsa Hatun Mosque" between 1390 and 1392 from the money she received in her dowry.

See also
Ottoman dynasty
Ottoman Empire

References

Year of birth missing
Year of death missing
14th-century consorts of Ottoman sultans
15th-century consorts of Ottoman sultans
Princesses